The 1994 Arizona Cardinals season was the franchise's 75th season with the National Football League (NFL), the seventh season in Arizona and the first season as the "Arizona Cardinals". Buddy Ryan became the 32nd head coach in Cardinals history. After being given a large share of the credit for the success of the Houston Oilers in 1993, Ryan was named head coach of the Arizona Cardinals in 1994. Also named general manager of the Cardinals, Ryan went 8–8 his first year, the Cardinals’ first non-losing season since 1984.

The Cardinals finished the season ranked third in the NFL in total defense, although it allowed only two fewer points in 1994 than they had in 1993. An anemic offense, one which saw three quarterbacks start at least one game, held the team back. Arizona scored 89 points fewer in 1994 than it did in 1993, and it finished with a minus-32-point differential after finishing at plus-57 in 1993.

Arizona lost its first two games by a combined five points, then were shut out 32–0 by the Cleveland Browns. The Cardinals recovered to enter the final week of the season with a shot at the playoffs, but those hopes were ended by a 10–6 loss to the Atlanta Falcons.

Offseason

NFL Draft

Personnel

Staff

Roster

Regular season

Schedule

Game summaries

Week 1

Week 2

Week 3

Week 5

Week 6

Week 7

Week 8

Week 9

Week 10

Week 11

Week 12

Week 13

Week 14 

    
    
    
    
    
    
    
    
    

This ninth successive defeat for the Oilers has the unusual distinction of being the most recent NFL game as of 2017 during which both teams scored a safety, and one of only eight since at least 1940.

Week 15

Week 16

Week 17

Standings

Awards and records 
 Aeneas Williams, NFL Leader, Interceptions (9)

References

External links 
 1994 Arizona Cardinals at Pro Football Reference

Arizona Cardinals
Arizona Cardinals seasons
Cardinals season